Victoria Elizabeth "Vicki" Hearne (February 13, 1946 – August 21, 2001) was an American author, philosopher, poet, animal trainer, and scholar of literary criticism and linguistics.

Biography
She was born in Austin, Texas, but, because her father was an Air Force Officer, her childhood was spent in a number of Air Force Bases.  The last, where her father retired, was in Riverside, California, where she attended the University of California. There, Hearne received her B.A. in English. She subsequently spent more than twenty-five years studying animal behavior as a horse and dog trainer. Central to Hearne's view on animal training was her belief that animals should not be defined by behaviorists' dictates, that in their individuality they have the capacity to be in reciprocal relationships with humans both emotionally and morally. In addition to her poetry, she authored several books on animals and animal-training theory, including Adam's Task, Bandit, and Animal Happiness. She received a 1992 award for outstanding literary achievement from the American Academy of Arts and Letters.

In the mid-1980s, she was offered an appointment at Yale, inducing a move from California to Connecticut. Eventually, she settled in Westbrook, Connecticut. While in Connecticut, she appeared in the Oscar-nominated short documentary, A Little Vicious.

Before she died she was an author of many beautiful pieces of work including; "News from the Dogs", "Young Dog, Grass and More", and "Trained Man and Dog"

She died at the age of 55 of lung cancer at the Connecticut Hospice in Branford, attended by her daughter Colleen Lehrman from a previous marriage, her husband Robert Tragesser and her brother, James Hearne. She was in addition survived by her father, William Victor Hearne.

Sources
Hafrey, Leigh. "You Can't Lie to a Dog—THE WHITE GERMAN SHEPHERD. By Vicki Hearne". The New York Times (June 26, 1988)
Boxer, Sarah. "Who You Calling a Pit Bull?—BANDIT: Dossier of a Dangerous Dog. By Vicki Hearne". The New York Times (December 15, 1991)
Verongos, Helen. "Vicki Hearne, Who Saw Human Traits in Pets, Dies at 55". The New York Times (August 27, 2001)

External links
Vicki Hearne mentioned in IMDb plot summary for A Little Vicious, the documentary short about Bandit, the dog
 
 Vicki Hearne Papers. Yale Collection of American Literature, Beinecke Rare Book and Manuscript Library.

1946 births
2001 deaths
20th-century American novelists
American literary critics
Women literary critics
American spiritual writers
American women novelists
American women poets
Novelists from Connecticut
Writers from Austin, Texas
People from Westbrook, Connecticut
Deaths from lung cancer
Deaths from cancer in Connecticut
20th-century American poets
American women essayists
Women science writers
20th-century American women writers
20th-century American essayists
Novelists from Texas
American nature writers
American women critics